Glasgow Camlachie was a burgh constituency represented in the House of Commons of the Parliament of the United Kingdom from 1885 until 1955.

It elected one Member of Parliament (MP) using the first-past-the-post voting system.

Boundaries

The Redistribution of Seats Act 1885 provided that the constituency was to consist of the second Municipal Ward, and so much of the third Municipal Ward as lies south of a line drawn along the centre of Duke Street.

In 1918 the constituency consisted of 

The Representation of the People Act 1948 provided that the constituency was to consist of 

The Parliamentary Constituencies (Scotland) (Glasgow Bridgeton, Glasgow Provan and Glasgow Shettleston) Order, 1955  provided for most of the area of the Camlachie constituency to be transferred to the new Glasgow Provan constituency, except for part of the Mile-End ward which was transferred to Glasgow Bridgeton.

Members of Parliament

Election results

Elections in the 1880s

Elections in the 1890s

The local Liberal association replaced Watt with Graham, due to the former's opposition to Irish Home Rule, Scottish church disestablishment and the temperance movement. They then replaced Graham with McCulloch, due to the former's attacks on Liberal policy and leadership.

Elections in the 1900s

Elections in the 1910s

Mirrlees was the candidate of the Scottish Federation of Women's Suffrage Societies. His candidacy had the effect of ensuring the election of Mackinder, who opposed women's suffrage at the expense of Hogge, who supported it.

General Election 1914–15:

Another General Election was required to take place before the end of 1915. The political parties had been making preparations for an election to take place and by July 1914, the following candidates had been selected; 
Unionist: Halford Mackinder
Liberal: Robert Shanks
Labour: James Alston

Elections in the 1920s

Elections in the 1930s

Elections in the 1940s

Elections in the 1950s

References

Historic parliamentary constituencies in Scotland (Westminster)
Constituencies of the Parliament of the United Kingdom established in 1885
Constituencies of the Parliament of the United Kingdom disestablished in 1955
Politics of Glasgow
Parkhead